The Circuito Retiro,  commonly known as the Retiro Circuit was a Grand Prix street circuit in Buenos Aires (Argentina). The  circuit is best known for hosting the first official Buenos Aires Grand Prix (I) Gran Premio Ciudad de Buenos Aires, official name: Gran Premio Juan Domingo Perón) on February 9, 1947, as the first organized international event by the Automóvil Club Argentino.

The 1947 Grand Prix at Retiro marks the start of the South American Temporada racing series.

Buenos Aires Grand Prix 1941, 1947

References

 
Retiro
Defunct motorsport venues